The Popular Republican Union is a political party in France, founded in 2007 by François Asselineau. The ideology of the party is a hard Eurosceptic, and seeks the withdrawal of France from the European Union and the Eurozone.

History

Foundation 
After leaving the UMP (2006) and the Rally for an Independent and Sovereign France (RIF, :fr:Rassemblement pour l'indépendance et la souveraineté de la France) where Asselineau was a member of the steering committee for 3 months, in 2007, for the 50th anniversary of the Rome Treaty signature, he created the Popular Republican Union (UPR).

2012 presidential election 
Asselineau confirmed his candidacy for the 2012 French presidential election in December 2011 during the national congress of the party. Asselineau was finally not among the ten candidates officially endorsed by the Constitutional council as he could muster only 17 signatures from elected officials out of the necessary 500

2012 legislative elections 
Asselineau and Régis Chamagne ran for the legislative election in the Lot-et-Garonne's 3rd constituency UPR failed to reach the second round, receiving less than one half of one percent of the vote.

2014 European Parliament election 
The party participated in the 2014 European Parliament election. However, a limited budget restricted active campaign mailings to only thirty departments. UPR scored 0.41% of votes cast for France and Asselineau scored 0.56% of votes cast in the Île-de-France constituency.

2015 departmental elections 
UPR ran in the 2015 departmental elections with 14 lists out of the 2,054 cantons. They intended to alert electors notably on UPR's program and that the local situation is the consequence of national and international circumstances. They were hoping to score honorably.

2015 regional elections 
In the regional elections of 2015, the UPR has just under 2,000 candidates in the 12 new continental metropolitan areas and in an overseas region, Reunion Island, which Slate calls "Amazing Performance For this political formation without elected, nor public funding ". François Asselineau is the leader in Île-de-France. The UPR proposes "the organization of referendums on major regional issues, such as the Olympic Games in Île-de-France or Notre-Dame-des-Landes in the Pays-de-la-Loire" Referendums of popular initiative at the regional level ", the renovation of high schools and the improvement of public transport.

On the national level, the UPR collects 0.87% of the votes cast (189 330 votes). In the Ile-de-France region, the list led by François Asselineau received 0.94% of the votes cast (29 755 votes). The UPR invites voters to abstain on the second round of the election.

2017 presidential election 

Asselineau declared that he would seek to run in the 2017 French presidential election, and managed to secure the 500 necessary sponsorships required to be listed on the first-round ballot. he got 332,547 votes or 0.92% coming in 9th place.

Ideology 
UPR runs on an anti-EU platform stating that all French policy decisions are made by an "unelected oligarchy, not French," leading to the political disaffection of the French public, and that the continued rule of the EU over European affairs will lead to a "global apartheid". UPR promotes that withdrawal from the European Union and the euro by the usage of TEU Article 50 as a first step to get France out of its current crisis by regaining capital, goods and person flow regulation control. For military sovereignty, UPR also consider France withdrawal from the NATO.

UPR also favors nationalisation of entities such as TF1, La Poste, Gaz de France, highways, water management and troubled banks.

Policy 
 Constitutional reforms would only be allowed by referendum.
 Reintroduction of articles of the Constitution; the one about the "Conspiracy against the state" and the other about the "Treachary of the President", which had been removed in 1993 and 2007 respectively.
 The instauration of popular initiative referendums like in Switzerland.
 When the protest votes win an election, the election will be reorganised excluding the previous candidates.
 To stop forced regroupments of communes.
 To withdraw France from the EU, euro and NATO.
 To make up with Russia, China, Arab states and Latin American states.
 To be a non-allied country.
 To prohibit electronic voting.
 To establish a Constitutional court like the one in Germany.
 To establish a quorum of 60% of parliament attendance.
 To make media's fund public.
 To protect whistleblowers such as Edward Snowden and Julian Assange.
 To nationalise water, electricity, railways, highways, the communication company Orange, banks receiving public aid and the post.
 To ban lobbying inside the parliament.
 To make think tanks' fund public.
 To raise the minimum wage to 1300 euros per month from 1153.
 To establish a minimum retirement benefit of 950 euros per month.
 To ban genetically modified crops.

Relationship with the media and Internet activism 
In February 2012, François Asselineau and his party, UPR, claimed they were "barred from the major media" ("barrés des grands médias") and "banned from going on the air" ("interdits d'antenne") as "[their] ideas are upsetting" ("[leur] discours dérange"). In 2014, UPR described itself as being "the most censored party in France".

On 23 April 2014, François Asselineau's party sent a registered letter to Conseil supérieur de l'audiovisuel (Audiovisual Superior Council) to demand "urgent action regarding the mainstream broadcasting media to have them accept UPR at last in their broadcasts".

The "news blackout" that Asselineau allegedly had to deal with was criticized again after the 2014 European elections, as his party obtained slightly more votes than Nouveau Parti anticapitaliste (0.41% vs 0.39%) without further attracting attention from the mainstream media.

In March 2012, Asselineau complained about the "censorship" he faced on French Wikipedia from which his article had been deleted several times for lack of renown. In February 2013, UPR complained about what it called "the ill treatment of François Asselineau and UPR on Wikipedia", with an extended report on the subject established by the "Groupe Wiki de l'UPR – Cybermilitantisme" (the "UPR Wiki Group- Internet activism").

Asselineau and his team are very active on the Internet: UPR claim to have developed "solely on the Internet" ("exclusivement en ligne") and bank above all on this activism to try to become notable. Rudy Reichstadt characterizes UPR as "a real phenomenon on the Internet", noting that it is "difficult to miss it when one is interested in the conspiracist circles" ("difficile de passer à côté lorsqu'on s'intéresse à la mouvance complotiste"). In 2012, UPR created the position of "national manager for Internet activism" ("responsable national au cybermilitantisme"), whose responsibility is to develop and coordinate the various people conducting such activism ("actions cybermilitantes").

However, there has been some backlash to this activism.  mentions the harassment that "every journalist has had to deal with, one day or another, at the hands of some UPR activists". Laurent Ruquier likewise noted that he invited François Asselineau to On n'est pas couché because of incessant Twitter pressure. After the broadcast of this program, an article on the collaborative website of L'Obs (Le Plus) expressed doubts about the granting of speaking time to "this kind of conspiracist", while  suggested that Laurent Ruquier had in fact invited Asselineau in order to ridicule his anti-European ideas.

On 28 October 2018, the CSA considered that France 5 has failed to comply with its obligation of rigour by assimilating the UPR to an extreme right-wing party.

Membership 
UPR claim to be a growing party despite what they deem to be "a blacklisting from the national media". The party has thus developed exclusively online strategies; Asselineau's conferences, for instance, have gathered more than two million views. UPR states theirs is the most visited French political party website as evidenced by their Alexa rank.

In 2013, the university researcher, Jean-Yves Camus doubts the reality of membership figures.

The 15 December 2016, UPR knows a large success : it counts from now on 14 000 membership, with an average of +26 membership per day.

Electoral results

See also 
:Category:Popular Republican Union (2007) politicians
 Politics of France
 List of political parties in France

References

External links 
 Official website 

Political parties in France
Political parties of the French Fifth Republic
Eurosceptic parties in France
2007 establishments in France
Political parties established in 2007
French nationalist parties
Opposition to NATO